Taki Fiti is an economist and former Minister of Finance of North Macedonia.

Taki Fiti was born on 7 November 1950 in Kruševo, North Macedonia. He is an ethnic Aromanian. He received his MA in 1980, and his Ph.D. in 1983 at the Faculty of Economics in Skopje. From 1996 - 1998, he was Minister of Finance of North Macedonia. He is currently Head of the Centre for Strategic Research, Macedonian Academy of Sciences and Arts (MANU).

The scope of his scientific interests includes economics, economic growth and development, state regulation, international capital flow, and entrepreneurship. He is author and co-author of 19 books, of which more important are: "Transnational companies and export of capital", "Modern capitalism", "Entrepreneurship and entrepreneurship management", "Economy - microeconomic approach", and "Economy - macroeconomic approach".

References

External links 
 

1950 births
Living people
Finance ministers of North Macedonia
People from Kruševo
Social Democratic Union of Macedonia politicians
Ss. Cyril and Methodius University of Skopje alumni
Macedonian people of Aromanian descent
Aromanian politicians